Tropone or 2,4,6-cycloheptatrien-1-one is an organic compound with some importance in organic chemistry as a non-benzenoid aromatic. The compound consists of a ring of seven carbon atoms with three conjugated alkene groups and a ketone group. The related compound tropolone (2-hydroxy-2,4,6-cycloheptatrien-1-one) has an additional alcohol (or an enol including the double bond) group next to the ketone.  Tropones are uncommon in natural products, with the notable exception of the 2-hydroxyl derivatives, which are called tropolones.
 
Tropone has been known since 1951 and is also called cycloheptatrienylium oxide. The name tropolone was coined by M. J. S. Dewar in 1945 in connection to perceived aromatic properties.

Properties
Dewar in 1945 proposed that tropones could have aromatic properties. The carbonyl group is more polarized as a result of the triene ring, giving a partial positive charge on the carbon atom (A) and a partial negative charge on oxygen.  In an extreme case, the carbon atom has a full positive charge (B) forming a tropylium ion ring which is an aromatic 6 electron system (C).
 

Tropones are also basic (D) as a result of the aromatic stabilization. This property can be observed in the ease of salt formation with acids. The dipole moment for tropone is 4.17 D compared to a value of only 3.04 D for cycloheptanone. This difference is consistent with stabilization of the dipolar resonance structure.

Synthesis
Numerous methods exist for the organic synthesis of tropones and its derivatives. Two selected methods for the synthesis of tropone are by selenium dioxide oxidation of cycloheptatriene and indirectly from tropinone by a Hofmann elimination and a bromination.

Reactions
Tropone undergoes ring contraction to benzoic acid with potassium hydroxide at elevated temperature. Many derivatives also contract to the corresponding arenes. Tropone reacts in electrophilic substitution, for instance with bromine, but the reaction proceeds through the 1,2-addition product and is not an electrophilic aromatic substitution.

Tropone derivatives also react in nucleophilic substitution very much like in nucleophilic aromatic substitution.

Tropone is also found to react in an [8+3]annulation with a cinnamic aldehyde

Diene character
Tropone behaves as a diene in a Diels-Alder reactions, for instance with maleic anhydride.  Similarly, it forms adducts with iron tricarbonyl, akin to (butadiene)iron tricarbonyl.

Derivatives

Other tropone derivatives include puberulonic and puberulic acids, roseobacticides, pernambucone, crototropone, orobanone.

References

 
Simple aromatic rings
Non-benzenoid aromatic carbocycles